Kumo o mo Tsukamu Tami (Japanese:雲をも掴む民 , Japanese Stylized as 雲をも摑む民) (English: People Have to Grasp Even a Cloud) is the third studio album by Japanese pop-rock band Porno Graffitti. It was released on March 27, 2002.

Track listing

References

2002 albums
Porno Graffitti albums
Japanese-language albums
Sony Music albums